Pittsburgh station may refer to several stations in Pittsburgh, Pennsylvania:

 Union Station (Pittsburgh) or Penn Station (opened 1903), currently the only operating intercity train station in Pittsburgh

Former stations
 Baltimore and Ohio Station (Pittsburgh) (1887–1955), currently occupied by Interstate 376 and the Smithfield Street Bridge
 Grant Street Station or B&O Pittsburgh Terminal (1957–1989), site now occupied by PNC and First Avenue station (PAAC)
 Pittsburgh & Lake Erie Railroad Station (opened 1898), now a restaurant in Station Square
 Wabash Pittsburgh Terminal (1904–1946), site now occupied by Gateway Center (Pittsburgh)

See also 
 Pittsburg (disambiguation)#Transportation